The van der Meulen family of Brussels was an important bourgeois family of freshwater fish merchants. Many of its members were deans of the guild of freshwater fish merchants.

Properties and estates 
They owned the fiefdom of the Roetaert as well as numerous fishponds and lakes, especially in the Sonian Forest, such as the famous Enfants Noyés ponds, which Elisabeth van der Meulen (1720–1769), wife of Jean-Baptiste van Dievoet (1704-1776), sold to the state in 1744.

Allied families

See also 

 Guilds of Brussels
Bourgeois of Brussels

Notes and references

Further reading 

 Daniel Leyniers, Genealogie der familie van der Meulen en Leyniers, manuscript book, 18th century, Archives of the City of Brussels, n° 2296.
 Sander Pierron, Histoire illustrée de la forêt de Soignes, vol. I, p. 62.
 Chloé Deligne, Bruxelles et sa rivière. Genèse d'un territoire urbain (12e - 18e siècle), Turnhout : Brepols, 2003, pp. 158, 159, 173, 176, 159, 160, 182, 193, 205
Businesspeople from Brussels
History of Brussels
Duchy of Brabant
Belgian families